Crasemann is a German surname. Notable people with the surname include:

Eduard Crasemann (1891–1950), German Wehrmacht general
Rudolph Crasemann (1841–1929), German businessman and politician

German-language surnames